Sar Cheqa (also Romanized as Sar Cheqā; also known as Sar Cheqeh and Sar Choqā Karand) is a village in Howmeh-ye Kerend Rural District, in the Central District of Dalahu County, Kermanshah Province, Iran. At the 2006 census, its population was 361, in 66 families.

References 

Populated places in Dalahu County